Irene Helen McAra-McWilliam,  is a design researcher and academic, specialising in design innovation. She has been the interim Director of the Glasgow School of Art since November 2018, having been head of its School of Design from 2005. Before moving to Glasgow, she was Professor and Business Fellow in Innovation at the Royal College of Art, and Professor of Design Research at Eindhoven University of Technology.

Honours
In the 2016 New Year Honours, she was appointed an Officer of the Order of the British Empire (OBE) "for services to art and design".

References

Living people
Design researchers
Academics of the Royal College of Art
Academic staff of the Eindhoven University of Technology
Academics of the Glasgow School of Art
Directors of the Glasgow School of Art
Officers of the Order of the British Empire
Year of birth missing (living people)